Gilles Pages (born 17 September 1963) is a Monegasque judoka. He competed in the men's extra-lightweight event at the 1988 Summer Olympics.

References

External links
 

1963 births
Living people
Monegasque male judoka
Olympic judoka of Monaco
Judoka at the 1988 Summer Olympics
Place of birth missing (living people)